Spiniphallellus is a genus of moths in the family Gelechiidae.

Species
Spiniphallellus desertus Bidzilya & Karsholt, 2008
Spiniphallellus fuscescens Bidzilya & Karsholt, 2008
Spiniphallellus stonisi Bidzilya & Karsholt, 2008

References

Anomologini